Narayanapur Rural  is a panchayat village in the southern state of Karnataka, India. It is located in the Shorapur Taluka of Yadgir district in Karnataka. It is located on the bank of  Krishna River and adjacent to the Dam called "Basavasagar" Narayanpur Dam.

There are few villages in the gram panchayat: Narayanpur Rural, Hanuman Nagar, Jangangaddi, Myalingaddi, and Tangadbail and so on

Demographics
 India census, the village of Narayanpur Rural had a population of 5,221 with 2,701 males and 2,520 females.

See more
The pilgrimage centre of Lordess https://www.tripuntold.com/karnataka/yadgir/chaya-bhagavathi-t is located on the bank of River Krishna.Lord chaya bhagavati shower a bundles of happiness, health and wealth to all. The brief description about this temple is explained in the below lines. The Lordess Chaya Bhagavati is the wife of Lord Sun. The special offerings of pooja is done here on every year of May or April and generally called as "Akshayatritiya". The devotees will do the yatra of 18 . The place is proudly said to be as a "Dakshina Kashi" and only on the day of Akshayatritiya the sun rise will fall in the foot of Chaya Devi.

References

External links
 

Villages in Yadgir district